The Raid at Renacer Prison was an attack on the El Renacer prison in Gamboa, Panama, by units of the 82nd Airborne Division of the US Army on 20 December 1989, during the United States invasion of Panama. During the raid the U.S. military freed the sixty-four prisoners held in the detention facility and killed 5 soldiers of the Panama Defense Forces. 

The U.S. force consisted of eighty paratroopers along with three UH-1 helicopters, two OH-58 scout helicopters, one (LCM) landing craft medium, and one AH-1 Cobra. The raiding force was made up of units drawn from the 7th Infantry Division, the 82nd Airborne Division, Company C of the 3rd Battalion of the 504th Parachute Infantry Regiment, the 1st Battalion of the 228th Aviation Regiment, the 307th Engineer Battalion, and the 1097th Transportation Company.

Plan
Renacer Prison sits beside the Panama Canal, roughly halfway across the Isthmus. Relative to other prisons it's not large. The  fenced yard measures no more than forty by seventy meters. The prison itself is a collection of around 20 cinderblock and wood buildings, all with tin roofs. By December 1989, the Noriega regime had filled it with political prisoners, many from the abortive coup of the previous October. Among the inmates were several Americans. 

The American plan involved a simultaneous air assault and amphibious landing at 1 am on 20 December in which two Hueys, each carrying 11 paratroopers, would land in the cramped prison yard. The door gunners would proceed to engage specific targets. Meanwhile, an AH-1 "Cobra" attack helicopter from the 7th Infantry Division would fire into the guards' barracks. The assault element, which was part of the 2nd Platoon, would then immediately search and secure the prisoners' barracks, the recreation building, and the other two major buildings. 

At the same time, the remainder of the 2nd Platoon would land from landing craft (LCM) on the canal side to provide fire support and security for the assault. The 3rd Platoon would also be on the LCM. Their part of the mission was to clear and secure the remaining buildings outside the prison's wire fence. One OH-58 scout helicopter carried a company sniper.

Finally a third Huey, carrying ten scouts, would land outside the prison to prevent any attempt by the PDF to reinforce the prisons garrison.

See also
Operation Acid Gambit

References

20th-century military history of the United States
Military raids
Conflicts in 1989
Panama
1989 in the United States
Invasions by the United States
1989 in Panama
Airborne operations
Invasions of Panama
Prison raids
December 1989 events in North America
United States invasion of Panama